The Helena Bridge is a cantilever bridge carrying U.S. Route 49 across the Mississippi River between Helena, Arkansas and Lula, Mississippi.

The main cantilever span was modeled on the similar Benjamin G. Humphreys Bridge which had been built downstream by Arkansas and Mississippi roughly two decades earlier.  However, the river navigation issues that led to the replacement of the Humphreys Bridge with the Greenville Bridge do not apply to the Helena Bridge, as the river curve here is far less severe than the one just upstream from the Humphreys and Greenville Bridges.

The bridge had a stated construction cost of $14 million, and was opened as a toll bridge in 1961 until that initial cost was repaid. The total length of the bridge is slightly less than a mile and it replaced an earlier ferry.  The bridge superstructure suffered its first substantial damage from a barge accident in July 1997.

References

See also

List of crossings of the Lower Mississippi River

Road bridges in Arkansas
Bridges over the Mississippi River
Bridges completed in 1961
Transportation in Phillips County, Arkansas
Buildings and structures in Phillips County, Arkansas
Road bridges in Mississippi
U.S. Route 49
Bridges of the United States Numbered Highway System
Articles containing video clips
Cantilever bridges in the United States
Interstate vehicle bridges in the United States
Transportation in Coahoma County, Mississippi
Buildings and structures in Coahoma County, Mississippi
1961 establishments in Arkansas
1961 establishments in Mississippi
Former toll bridges in Arkansas